Jules Jean Vanobbergen (6 July 1936 – 1 December 2021) was a Belgian singer-songwriter better known as Grand Jojo in French and Lange Jojo in Dutch. Grand Jojo is best known as the co-writer of "Anderlecht Champions (Allez, Allez, Allez)", which later became "Olé, Olé, Olé", and "Chef, un p'tit verre, on a soif" (Barman, a little drink, we are thirsty).

Early life 
Vanobbergen was born on 6 July 1936 in Ixelles. He enrolled  in the Académie Royale des Beaux-Arts, because he wanted to become a painter. At the academy he received the nickname Grand Jojo/Lange Jojo. After graduating, he first worked as a marketing draughtsman then as a cartoonist.

Career 
While he was working in a record store, he realized that the market, at the time, lacked festive songs. Therefore, he decided to write his own songs under the alias Grand Jojo. Initially, his songs were only released in French, however, being bilingual, he always recorded a Dutch version as well.

Grand Jojo was a Belgian icon who represented his country by displaying the typical Belgian identity often based on self-mockery and referred to as belgitude (French).

Grand Jojo mainly performed drinking songs such as "Chef, un p'tit verre, on a soif", "Sergent Flagada", "La petite bête à bon Dieu", and "Jules César". For his debut performances, he chose surrealistic tango songs such as "Le Tango du Congo", "Victor le footbaliste" and "Sitting Bull".

In 1985, as R.S.C. Anderlecht won its third consecutive title in the Belgian First Division A, he released a single called "Anderlecht champion" and then decided to adapt the lyrics in "E viva Mexico", a song he published for the 1986 FIFA World Cup where the Belgium national football team made it to the semifinals.

The song "We are the Champions (Allez, Allez, Allez)" later became corrupted as "Olé, Olé, Olé".

His 1979 single "Chef, un p'tit verre, on a soif" was notably used by the presumed killer of Grégory Villemin, a four-year-old who was kidnapped and killed in France in 1984. Three years before the kidnapping, the main suspect in that case, called "corbeau" (meaning raven), had harassed Grégory's parents on the phone by playing the song every time he called.

Later life 
In 2006 (in Francopholies de Spa, a music festival in Belgium), Grand Jojo made a come back and joined the stage with ska punk bands such as Skaïra, as well as Poulycroc, who for the occasion released an album paying tribute to Grand Jojo. A Grand Jojo tribute concert took place in Louvain-la-Neuve on 7 September 2007, after an invitation from the régional athois and the CESEC—a student organization in economic, social and political sciences—during a celebration of their 30th anniversary.

In 2011, Grand Jojo returned to Universal Music Belgium. In December 2013, Grand Jojo performed at the Cirque Royal in March and at Forest National.  Grand Jojo announced his retirement on 29 June 2021. Vanobbergen died on 1 December 2021 at the age of 85.

Awards and legacy 
On 11 May, 1998, Vanobbergen was knighted in the Order of Leopold. Grand Jojo was made an honorary citizen of Brussels in 2015. Manneken Pis wore a Jules César costume in his honour at the award ceremony. That same year he was awarded the Silver Medal of the National Order of the Golden Fry Cone as recognition of being the sponsor of "Week of the Fry 2015". In 2016 he was made an honorary citizen of the Marolles.

Grand Jojo published his autobiography Tout va très bien in October 2015. In 2019, Grand Jojo officially inaugurated his own museum at Boussu-lez-Walcourt with his friends Frédéric François and Claude Barzotti.

Select discography 
 1977 Le Grand Jojo et Cie
 1982 Jules César
 1982 Animation
 1984 Vive les Saints!
 1984 Pour la danse, c'est super!
 1984 Dansez avec Agadou, La chenille et La danse des canards
 1984 C'est super
 1984 Il fait chaud
 1985 Hits n °1985
 1986 Noces et banquets
 1986 Agadou
 1987 Dansez avec la chenille et la danse des canards
 before 1988 Z'n beste... 
 before 1988 Faites la fete
 before 1988 Plein tube
 1988 Super bastringue
 1988 Viens boire un p'tit coup à la maison
 1989 On a soif
 2012 Grand best of
 2013 De beste 
 2013 Double rest of
 2013 Tournée Général !
 2014 Back to back with André van Duin 
 2015 Tout va très bien
 2016 Collection

References

External links

 Official website 
 
 
 

1936 births
2021 deaths
Académie Royale des Beaux-Arts alumni
Belgian cartoonists
Belgian male singers
Musicians from Brussels
Order of Leopold (Belgium)
People from Ixelles
Schlager musicians